The culture of North America refers to the arts and other manifestations of human activities and achievements from the continent of North America. Cultures of North America reflect not only that of the continent's indigenous peoples but those cultures that followed European colonisation as well.

Music 
 American music
 African-American music
American folk music
 American popular music
Creole music
 Canadian music
 Indigenous music of Canada
 Costa Rican music
 Cuban music
 Cuban folk music
 Dominican music (Dominica)
 Dominican music (Dominican Republic)
 Guatemala music
Honduran music
 Indigenous music of North America
Jamaican music
 Mexican music
Nicaraguan music
 Salvadoran music

Mythology and folklore

 American folklore
 Hawaiian folklore
 Hawaiian mythology
 Mexican-American folklore
 American mythology
Canadian folklore

Honduran folklore
 Indigenous mythologies of the Americas
 Mexican folktales

Languages

North-American English (see Anglo-America):

 American English
 Canadian English

Indigenous languages:

 Cree
 Ojibwe

French:

 American French
 Frenchville French
 Louisiana French
 Missouri French
 Muskrat French
 New England French (a variety of Canadian French spoken in New England)
 Canadian French
 Quebec French
 Ontario French
 Métis French
 Michif
 Acadian French
 Chiac
 Brayon
 Newfoundland French
 Haitian French
 Saint-Barthélemy French

Spanish:

 American Spanish
 Isleño Spanish
 New-Mexican Spanish
 Canarian Spanish
 Caribbean Spanish
 Central-American Spanish
 Costa Rican Spanish
 Cuban Spanish
 Dominican Spanish
 Guatemalan Spanish
 Mexican Spanish
 Puerto-Rican Spanish

Creole languages:

 Antillean Creole
 Haitian Creole
 Jamaican Creole
 Louisiana Creole
 Papiamento
 Spanglish

Literature

 American literature
 Canadian literature
 Indigenous literature of Canada
 Costa Rican literature
 Cuban literature
 Guatemalan literature
 Honduran literature
 Jamaican literature
 Mexican literature

Religion

Clothing

 American clothing (Western wear)
 American fashion
 Native American fashion

Cuisine

 American cuisine
 Canadian cuisine
 French-Canadian cuisine
 Dominica cuisine
 Jamaican cuisine
 Mexican cuisine
 Mexican cuisine in the United States

Symbols

 Symbols of the United States
 Symbols of Canada
 Symbols of Alberta
 Symbols of British Columbia
 Symbols of Manitoba
 Symbols of Newfoundland and Labrador
 Symbols of the Northwest Territories
 Symbols of Nova Scotia
 Symbols of Nunavut
 Symbols of Ontario
 Symbols of Prince Edward Island
 Symbols of Quebec
 Symbols of Saskatchewan
 Symbols of Yukon
 Symbols of Mexico

See also

 Culture of Africa
 Culture of Asia
 Culture of Europe
 Culture of Oceania
 Culture of South America

External links
 North American History and Culture